Ivana Ranilović-Vrdoljak (born 1 September 1970 in Koprivnica, Croatia, SFR Yugoslavia), better known by her stage name Vanna, is a Croatian pop singer.

Biography
As a child, Vanna won prizes in various national children and youth festivals. Her debut was at the 1990 Zagrebfest, a music festival held in Zagreb. In that year she left her hometown to live and study in Zagreb and whilst studying, she performed in a band called BOA singing back vocals.

In 1992 her professional career as a singer was launched. She joined a eurodance band called Electro Team who started to perform as hip hop and pop rap group and became an instant star. Not only was she a singer but a co-author and songwriter of all the songs performed by Electro Team. The song "Tek je 12 sati" where group turned to eurodance sound became a huge hit in 1993, and was popular elsewhere across the former Yugoslavia republics.

In 1997, Vanna left Electro Team to start a solo career and record her first album, I to sam ja which brought her own versions of country, blues and jazz standards. As solo artist she turned to more mature urban europop and r′n′b with elements of pop rock in some songs. Her first author album "Ispod istog neba" mostly oriented to electronic r′n′b was published in 1998 at the end of the decade and won two Porin awards for best female vocal and best vocal cooperation in duet "Ja ću budna sanjati" with singer songwriter Zlatan Stipišić Gibonni . She has since recorded three more solo albums and has won several other awards. She came first at Zadarfest (held in Zadar) three years in succession (1999, 2000 and 2001). Her album 24 sata which brought more faster europop songs was published in 2000. and reached gold..

In 2000., she came in second in Dora, the Croatian national final for the Eurovision Song Contest with a song written by Bruno Kovačić and Ivana Plechinger. Being runner-up, she decided to participate again in 2001 and won with Tonči Huljić's song Strune ljubavi. Shortly after Dora, she gave birth to daughter Jana. Vanna represented Croatia in the Eurovision Song Contest 2001 in Copenhagen on 12 May 2001 and finished 10th. She sang the song in Croatian and in English, now entitled "Strings of My Heart".

After Eurovision, Vanna released a live album called Vanna u Lisinskom published in 2001 and won Zadarfest again with "Više nisi moj". She won prizes in several other festivals. In 2003, a fourth album "Hrabra kao prije" was published and brought more organic r′n′b oriented pop sound with more elements of pop rock. In the late 2000s and early 2010s, Vanna took a successful turn to more solid power pop and pop rock music with some acoustic ballad on albums "Ledeno doba" from 2007, and "Sjaj" from 2011, which proved that she can successfully sing any style not just pop and dance music.

In 2012., she had a guest appearance on the track "Za tvoje oči" from the album Praštam of Serbian rock band Neverne Bebe. After seven years of discography hiatus, her last studio album "Izmješane boje" was published in 2019., brought return to pop, dance and r′n′b music and won award Porin for the best pop album of the year. 

Vanna is married to Andrija Vrdoljak, son of Croatian film director Antun Vrdoljak, and they have two children, Luka (born c. 1997.) and Jana (born c. 2001.). The family lives in Zagreb.

Discography

Albums
 Electro Team (1992, with Electro Team)
 Second To None (1994, with Electro Team)
 Anno Domini 1996 (1996, with Electro Team)
 I to sam ja (1997)
 Ispod istog neba (1998)
 24 sata (2000)
 U Lisinskom (2001)
 Hrabra kao prije (2003)
 Ledeno doba (2007)
 Sjaj (2010)
Izmiješane boje (2019)

Singles

References

External links

1970 births
Living people
Eurovision Song Contest entrants for Croatia
20th-century Croatian women singers
Croatian pop singers
Croatian sopranos
Eurovision Song Contest entrants of 2001
People from Koprivnica
Musicians from Zagreb
21st-century Croatian women singers